USS San Diego may refer to:

 , originally the armored cruiser California (1907-1914); renamed San Diego (1914-1918)
 , a light cruiser commissioned in 1942 in service throughout the Pacific War, and decommissioned 1946
 , a combat stores ship in service from 1969 to 1997
 , a San Antonio-class amphibious transport dock, launched in 2010
 

United States Navy ship names